Benjamin Joseph Reynolds (January 29, 1927 – August 25, 1976) was a Republican member of the Pennsylvania House of Representatives.

Biography
Reynolds was born on January 29, 1927, in West Grove, Pennsylvania. He attended Kennett Consolidated School and became a dairy farmer and milk retailer. He was elected a supervisor of New Garden Township (1960-1965). He was elected to the Pennsylvania House of Representatives in 1964 and served four consecutive terms; he declined to run for re-election in 1972.

Reynolds married Eleanor Annette Marshall (1924-1999) on January 2, 1960. They lived in the Reynolds homestead near Avondale, Pennsylvania, and had two sons, Warren and John.

Reynolds was interested in conservation and was an early promoter of spray irrigation of farmland.  He died August 25, 1976, and was buried in the New Garden Friends Cemetery in New Garden.

References

Republican Party members of the Pennsylvania House of Representatives
1976 deaths
1927 births
20th-century American politicians